Delphinium leucophaeum is an endangered species of larkspur known by the common name white rock larkspur or pale larkspur. It is endemic to the Willamette Valley of Oregon. Some consider it to be a synonym for or variety of Delphinium nuttallii.

References

External links

Flora of Oregon
leucophaeum
Flora without expected TNC conservation status